Alaeddine Labiod (born 2 October 1990) is an Algerian footballer who plays for MC El Eulma as a midfielder.

References

External links

1990 births
Living people
Association football midfielders
Algerian footballers
MC El Eulma players
USM Bel Abbès players
21st-century Algerian people